Šamac can refer to:

 Šamac, Bosnia and Herzegovina, a town on the right bank of the river Sava, in Bosnia
 FK Borac Šamac, an association football club
 Slavonski Šamac, a town on the left bank of the river Sava, in Croatia

sh:Šamac